Kovařík (feminine Kovaříková) is a Czech surname. Notable people with the surname include:

 Jan Kovařík (born 1988), Czech football player
 Josef Kovařík (born 1966), Czech-Czechoslovak Nordic combined skier
 Libor Kovařík, Czech football referee
 Ondřej Kovařík, Czech politician
 Radka Kovaříková (born 1975), Czech pair skater

See also 
 33058 Kovařík, main-belt asteroid

Czech-language surnames